Deflorate is the fourth studio album by American melodic death metal band The Black Dahlia Murder. Released through Metal Blade Records on September 15, 2009. The album sold 12,000 copies in the United States in its first week of release and debuted at position #43 on the Billboard 200.

Background
Deflorate is the first album to feature new guitarist Ryan Knight, who replaced John Kempainen. Trevor has stated in an interview that the album has more of a "classic feel" and that the drums have more of a "live sound". Trevor has also touched on the lyrical subjects of some songs, such as "I Will Return" being about cryogenic freezing. The third track of the album, "A Selection Unnatural", was made available for streaming on July 7, 2009, through the Revolver website. The cover art was painted by Tony Koehl. The album comes with a bonus DVD titled "We're Going Places (We've Never Been Before)" that contains tour footage from around the world as well as in-studio recording footage. A video for "Necropolis" was made available at the Revolver website on September 4, 2009. Necropolis is also a free song for the IOS rhythm game Tap Tap Revenge 3 and was a part of the soundtrack for the 2011 video game Saint's Row: The Third. The album reached to #43 on the Billboard 200 in one week.

Track listing

Personnel
The Black Dahlia Murder
Trevor Strnad – vocals
Ryan Knight – lead guitar
Brian Eschbach – rhythm guitar
Ryan Williams – bass
Shannon Lucas – drums
Production
Produced by Jason Suecof, Mark Lewis and The Black Dahlia Murder

Additional personnel
 Jason Suecof – outro guitar solo on "I Will Return"

Album charts

References

2009 albums
The Black Dahlia Murder (band) albums
Metal Blade Records albums
Albums produced by Jason Suecof
Albums produced by Mark Lewis (music producer)